Minuscule 643 (in the Gregory-Aland numbering), α 1402 (von Soden), is a Greek minuscule manuscript of the New Testament, on paper. Palaeographically, it has been assigned to the 12th or the 13th century. The manuscript is lacunose. Gregory labelled it by 219a, while Scrivener labelled it by 225a.

Description 

The codex contains the text of the Catholic epistles except Epistle of Jude on 15 paper leaves (size ) with some lacunae (Acts 4:15-32; Ephesians 6:21-24; Hebrews 13:24-25). The text is written in one column per page, 28-32 lines per page, by an elegant hand.

It has a space on the margin for a commentary.

The order of books: Epistle of James, 1-2 Epistles of Peter, 1-3 Epistles of John.

The same manuscript contains Homilies of St. Chrysostom from the Galatians to the Hebrews.

Text 

Kurt Aland the Greek text of the codex did not place in any Category.

According to Scrivener it has important variations (James 1:5.25; 3:3.14).

History 

The manuscript is dated by the INTF to the 12th/13th century.

The manuscript was added to the list of New Testament manuscripts by Scrivener (225a) and Gregory (219a). C. R. Gregory saw the manuscript in 1883. In 1908 Gregory gave the number 643 to it.

The manuscript currently is housed at the British Library (Burney MS 48/2), at London.

See also 

 List of New Testament minuscules
 Biblical manuscript
 Textual criticism

References

Further reading 
  (as l)

Greek New Testament minuscules
12th-century biblical manuscripts
Burney Collection